Al Taawon Club is a football club from Al Jeer, Ras Al Khaimah, United Arab Emirates.

Current squad 
As of UAE Division One:

{|
|-
| valign="top" |

References

Taawon
Taawon